Hypodoxa corrosa is a moth of the family Geometridae first described by William Warren in 1907. It is found on New Guinea.

References

Moths described in 1907
Pseudoterpnini